This article lists important figures and events in the public affairs of British Malaya during the year 1940, together with births and deaths of prominent Malayans.

Incumbent political figures

Central level 
 Monarch : King George VI
 High Commissioner to the Malay States :
 Shenton Whitelegge Thomas
 Federal Secretary of the Federated of Malay States :
 Hugh Fraser
 Governor of Straits Settlements :
 Shenton Whitelegge Thomas

State level

Straits Settlements
  Penang :
 Residents-Councillors :  Arthur Mitchell Goodman
  Malacca :
 Residents-Councillors :

Federated Malay States
  Selangor :
 British Residents of Selangor : G. M. Kidd
 Sultan of Selangor : Sultan Sir Hishamuddin Alam Shah Al-Haj 
  Negri Sembilan :
 British Residents of Negri Sembilan : John Vincent Cowgill
 Yang di-Pertuan Besar of Negri Sembilan : Tuanku Abdul Rahman ibni Almarhum Tuanku Muhammad 
   Pahang :
 British Residents of Pahang : C. C. Brown
 Sultan of Pahang : Sultan Abu Bakar
  Perak :
 British Residents of Perak : Marcus Rex 
 Sultan of Perak : Sultan Abdul Aziz Al-Mutasim Billah Shah Ibni Almarhum Raja Muda Musa I

Other states
  Perlis :
 Raja of Perlis : Syed Alwi Syed Saffi Jamalullail
  Johore :
 Sultan of Johor : Sultan Ibrahim Al-Masyhur
  Kedah :
 Sultan of Kedah : Abdul Hamid Halim Shah
  Kelantan :
 Sultan of Kelantan : Sultan Ismail Sultan Muhammad IV
  Trengganu :
 Sultan of Trengganu : Sulaiman Badrul Alam Shah

Events 
 25 October – Chinese High School was established in Batu Pahat, Johor.
 Unknown date – Kinta Rubber Works, the first manufacturer of rubber products in Malaysia was established in Ipoh, Perak.
 Unknown date – Lam Eng Rubber (M) company, a Malaysian manufacturer of natural rubber, was founded.
 Unknown date – Malaysian Nature Society was founded.
 Unknown date – The Board of Commissioners of Currency of Malaya printed an issue of paper money with denominations of one, five and ten dollars; the colours of these banknotes were green, blue, and purple, respectively.

Births
 11 March – Haron Din – Politician (died 2016)
 28 June – Karpal Singh – Malaysian politician and lawyer (died 2014)
 29 July – Mohamad Aziz – Politician
 17 August – Joseph Pairin Kitingan – Former 7th Chief Minister of Sabah
 15 September – Abu Hassan Omar – 12th Menteri Besar Selangor
 24 December – Endon Mahmood – Wife to former Prime Minister of Malaysia, Tun Abdullah Ahmad Badawi (died 2005)
 Unknown date – Asmah Haji Omar – Writer
 Unknown date – Wan Chik Daud – Actor

See also
 1940 
 1941 in Malaya
 History of Malaysia

References

1940s in Malaya
Malaya